The Armenian congress at Erzurum (the 8th World Congress of the Armenian Revolutionary Federation), held from the end of July to August 2, 1914, was a watershed event where representatives of the ruling Committee of Union and Progress party requested the Armenian Revolutionary Federation (the leading Armenian party in both the Ottoman and the Russian Empire) to incite a rebellion of Russian Armenians against the Tsarist regime in order to facilitate the conquest of Transcaucasia in the event of the opening up of a Caucasus front.

Proposals
The Ottoman plan was to draw the Persians, Kurds, Tatars and Georgians into a holy war against the Allies.  In order to carry this project it was necessary to make sure that Armenian (if the Armenians became hostile), their geographical position would not hamper cooperation between these races. If this agreement went forward and the Ottoman Armenians did not support the Russians, they would be offered autonomy. This offer was one step forward from Armenian reform package, which was already established in February 1914. 

The Tsar promised autonomy for Russian Armenia. The Tsar promised autonomy to six Turkish Armenian vilayets as well as the two Russian-Armenian provinces. Earlier a Tsarist Minister of Foreign Affairs reportedly had confided Russia's aim: "We need Armenia, but without the Armenians." Primarily because of trust in France and Great Britain as associates of Russia, the Armenian National Council of the Russian Empire accepted the Tsar's offer. A representative meeting of Russian Armenians assembled in Tiflis, Caucasus, during August 1914. Tsar asked Armenian's loyalty and support for Russia in the conflict. The proposal was agreed upon and nearly 20,000 Armenians responded to the call, of which only 7,000 were given arms.

Members 
Negotiations in Erzurum were held between Armenian liaisons Arshak Vramian, Rostom (Stepan Zorian), and E. Aknouni (Khatchatour Maloumian), and Ottoman liaisons Dr. Behaeddin Shakir, Omer Naji (Omer Naci), and Hilmi Bey, accompanied by an international entourage of peoples from the Caucasus.

Conclusion
The Armenians were quite willing to remain loyal to their government, but declared their inability to agree to the other proposal, that of inciting their compatriots under Russian rule to insurrection. 

The rejection by the Ottoman Armenians of that one condition led to serious consequences for themselves. Learning of a possible conflict with Russian Armenians, the Ottoman government in September 1914 decided that the aliens (Russian Armenians) and Turkish Armenians would be a liability in a war against Russia. This incidentally proved of inestimable benefit to the Allies. For if the whole Armenian nation had gone against Russia, that country might have encountered defeat instead of victories early in the war. The Central Powers could have transferred large armies from the Eastern to the Western Front already in 1915 instead of 1917 with the result of such agreement.

It is claimed that the proposal was developed by the German Intelligence Bureau for the East, headquartered in Istanbul. The Intelligence Bureau for the East was established on the eve of World War I dedicated to promoting and sustaining subversive and nationalist agitations in the British Indian Empire and the Persian and Egyptian satellite states. It was involved in early plans for war and the Ottoman Caliph's decision to declare Jihad. 

The Ottoman Empire dismantled the Armenian reform package on December 16, 1914, just after the first engagement of the Caucasus Campaign during the Bergmann Offensive on November 2, 1914. On the other side, the Tsar visited the Caucasus front on December 30, 1914, telling the head of the Armenian Church that "a most brilliant future awaits the Armenians".

See also
Armenian reform package

References

1914 in Armenia
1914 in the Ottoman Empire
1914 conferences